Kevin Hansen (born 13 August 1979) is a German former professional footballer who played as a midfielder.

Career
Hansen was born in Hamburg. He spent four seasons in the Bundesliga with Hansa Rostock. After his contract with Hansa Rostock expired in summer 2007, he joined Erzgebirge Aue in the 2. Bundesliga on a two-year contract.

Background
In April 2010, he was taken into custody by German police for his involvement in cocaine smuggling from Paraguay to Germany.

References

External links
 

1979 births
Living people
German footballers
Footballers from Hamburg
Association football midfielders
Bundesliga players
2. Bundesliga players
FC Hansa Rostock players
FC Erzgebirge Aue players